Cure Cottage at 43 Forest Hill Avenue is a historic cure cottage located at Saranac Lake, Essex County, New York. It was built about 1912, and is a two-story, wood-frame dwelling on a stone foundation. It has a steep gable roof with overhanging eaves and is sheathed in clapboard siding. It remained in use as a cure cottage until 1928.

It was added to the National Register of Historic Places in 2012.

References

Houses on the National Register of Historic Places in New York (state)
Houses completed in 1912
Buildings and structures in Essex County, New York
National Register of Historic Places in Essex County, New York